Norbert Walter (born July 1, 1979 in Berlin) is a German professional volleyball player. His position on the field is middle blocker. He is currently playing for Italian side Canadiens Mantova. He's playing for the national team since 1999.

Before coming to Belgium, Walter played in Germany (a.o. SCC Berlin and VfB Friedrichshafen), Austria (Aon hotVolleys Vienna), France and Knack Randstad Roeselare in Belgium.

References

External links
Official home page 
Norbert Walter player info at the official Knack Roeselare site 
Information about Norbert Walter 
Images of Norbert Walter 

Living people
1979 births
Volleyball players from Berlin
German men's volleyball players